Kirov Reservoir, is a reservoir of the Talas River, located in Manas District of Talas Province of Kyrgyzstan. It is used for irrigation of lands in Kyrgyzstan and Kazakhstan.

External links
The Commission of the Republic of Kazakhstan and the Kyrgyz Republic on the Use of Water Management Facilities of Intergovernmental Status on the Rivers Chu and Talas

References

Reservoirs built in the Soviet Union
Reservoirs in Kyrgyzstan